Evelyn Peak is a  mountain summit in the Athabasca River valley of Jasper National Park, in the Canadian Rockies of Alberta, Canada. All three are part of the Maligne Range. Evelyn Peak is composed of sedimentary rock laid down during the Cambrian period and pushed east and over the top of younger rock during the Laramide orogeny. The mountain is at the headwaters of Evelyn Creek, and three kilometres south of Evelyn Pass. The creek and pass were named in 1921 for Evelyn Cavendish, Duchess of Devonshire (1870–1960), who visited nearby Maligne Lake in 1920. The mountain's name however, has not yet been officially adopted by the Geographical Names Board of Canada.     


Climate
Based on the Köppen climate classification, Evelyn Peak is in a subarctic climate zone with cold, snowy winters, and mild summers.

See also
 Geography of Alberta

References

External links
 Jasper National Park

Two-thousanders of Alberta
Canadian Rockies
Mountains of Jasper National Park
Alberta's Rockies